Mildred Douglas Chrisman (August 21, 1895 – January 25, 1982) is a 1988 National Cowgirl Museum and Hall of Fame inductee.

Life
Mildred Douglas Chrisman was born Mildred May McConnell in Philadelphia, Pennsylvania, on August 21, 1895. At 7, her parents took her to the Barnum and Bailey Circus at Franklin Field. Chrisman became determined she would perform with many kinds of animals. When she was 22, she won the World Champion Girl Bronc Rider title. She became skilled as a trick rider and shooter. She seemed fated to star in the type of shows she attended as a child.

Career

However, Chrisman was not born to a cowgirl life. She dropped out of an East Coast finishing school to join the Miller Brothers 101 Ranch show. Chrisman performed for years in the rodeo, wild west show, circus, and other venue circuits for years. It was at the 101 Ranch show that she met her husband-to-be, Pat Chrisman. Pat trained silent film star Tom Mix's horse. Chrisman became interested in motion pictures, and got herself film parts, including parts working with Tom Mix himself. She rode horses in films and trained many animals, such as horses, lions, leopards, and others.

In 1953, Pat died and that led Chrisman to pursue a different dream she'd had. She had always wanted to be a nurse. In 1954, at age 59, she entered the profession and accepted a position at the Comanche County Memorial Hospital in Lawton, Oklahoma. With her past profession not completely out of mind, she brought her scrapbooks to the hospital to share with co-workers and patients. The last venture she took on was creating a museum of her memorabilia which she donated to the Museum of the Great Plains in Lawton, Oklahoma. She died in January 25, 1982, at 86 years of age.

References 

1895 births
1982 deaths
People from Philadelphia
Sportspeople from Oklahoma
Trick riding
Bronc riders
American female equestrians
Cowgirl Hall of Fame inductees